The Millennium Forest for Scotland project was an initiative created by the Millennium Commission and funded by the National Lottery of the United Kingdom to celebrate the turn of the New Millennium. 

Conceived in 1994, the project's ambition was to restore and maintain a significant amount of the forestry in the Scottish environment, and secondly to reestablish the link between local communities and the environment that surrounded them.

The project's nationwide appeal led to many local communities, farms and established natural projects (such as the National Trust for Scotland and the World Wildlife Fund) investing time and money in restoring and maintaining many areas of natural importance throughout Scotland.

As a result of the initiative, it is estimated that the project has restored over 22,000 hectares of forest and natural land and created 200 kilometers of new hiking trails.

Some locations that the project has helped include:
Angus Millennium Forest, Angus
Balmaha Millennium Forest Park, Balmaha
The Millennium Forest, Borgie, Sutherland
Mugdock Country Park, Milngavie
Cashel Millenium Forest, Loch Lomond
Craigrostan Woods, Inversnaid
Edinburgh (urban forest project)

Although the project was aimed for the turn of the millennium, the efforts and investment in the project lasted over a period of 12 years, with many of the benefits still being felt today. The project ceased to exist following the winding-up of the Millenium Commission in 2006. As seen above, many signposts and markers symbolizing the initiative's legacy can still be seen around Scotland.

See also

 – (Angela Roe, University of Minnesota, 1999)

References

NatureScot
Defunct public bodies of the United Kingdom
Turn of the third millennium